Pantanal is a Brazilian telenovela that aired on Rede Manchete from March 27, 1990 to December 10, 1990. The series is written by Benedito Ruy Barbosa and directed by Jayme Monjardim, Carlos Magalhães, Marcelo de Barreto, and Roberto Naar. It is set on the Pantanal region in Mato Grosso do Sul located in midwestern Brazil.

Pantanal is considered an ecological or environmental telenovela; a small sub-category of the genre whose purpose is to dramatize, and raise audience awareness of environmental degradation.

Plot 
In the 1940s, Joventino arrives in the Pantanal of Mato Grosso accompanied by his 10-year-old son, José "Zé" Leôncio. Once settled, he becomes one of the main cattle breeders in the region. After Joventino disappeared in the Pantanal while hunting for oxen in the fields, Zé carries on his father's dream and becomes one of the main farmers in the country. On a visit to Rio de Janeiro, Zé falls in love with Madeleine, a spoiled girl with whom he marries and has a son named Joventino "Jove", bearing his grandfather's name. The differences between the couple, and Madeleine not adapting to the rural world, leads to her abandoning Zé and taking their son with her. Abandoned by Madeleine, Zé finds affection with Filó, a former prostitute who has a son, Tadeu.

Years later, Jove, now an adult, finally decides to move in with his father. However, the differences again bring problems for Zé and the two find it difficult to understand each other. The differences are aggravated when Jove falls in love with Juma Marruá, a wild and sensual young woman raised as a savage by her mother until her death, killed in revenge in a dispute between land squatters and victims of hoarding. Like her mother, Juma is said in the Pantanal to transform into a jaguar. Feeling rejected by his father, who thinks his son is effeminate, and ridiculed by the peasants for his city boy ways, Jove decides to return to Rio de Janeiro and takes Juma with him. After a time in Rio, where the culture shock is now suffered by Juma, Jove returns to the Pantanal so as not to be separated from his beloved. This time, he is willing to adapt to the local lifestyle. Jove begins to settle down with his father and Juma and gradually becomes a true Pantanaler, surprising everyone little by little.

Cast

Main 
 Cláudio Marzo as José "Zé" Leôncio / Joventino "Velho do Rio"
 Marcos Winter as Joventino "Jove" Leôncio Neto
 Cristiana Oliveira as Juma Marruá
 Marcos Palmeira as Tadeu
 Jussara Freire as Filomena "Filó" Aparecida
 Tânia Alves as Young Filó
 Paulo Gorgulho as Young José Leôncio / José Lucas de Nada
 Ítala Nandi as Madeleine Braga Novaes
 Ingra Liberato as Young Madeleine
 José de Abreu as Gustavo
 Elaine Cristina as Irma Braga Novaes
 Carolina Ferraz as Young Irma
 Nathália Timberg as Mariana Braga Novaes
 Ângela Leal as Maria Bruaca
 Ângelo Antônio as Alcides
 Luciene Adami as Maria Augusta "Guta"
 Tarcísio Filho as Marcelo
 Sérgio Reis as Tibério
 Andréa Richa as Maria Rute "Muda"
 Rosamaria Murtinho as Zuleika
 Antônio Petrin as Tenório
 Flávia Monteiro as Nalvinha
 Ernesto Piccolo as Renato "Reno"
 Eduardo Cardoso as Roberto "Beto"
 Almir Sater as Xeréu Trindade
 Rômulo Arantes as Levy
 Marcos Caruso as Tião
 Ewerton de Castro as Quim
 Giovanna Gold as Zefa
 João Alberto Carvalho as Zaqueu
 Ivan de Almeida as Orlando
 Lana Francis as Teca
 Gláucia Rodrigues as Matilde
 Luiz Henrique Sant'Agostinho as Ari

Guest stars 
 Cássia Kiss as Maria Marruá
 José Dumont as Gil
 Oswaldo Loureiro as Chico
 Sérgio Britto as Antero Novaes
 Sérgio Mamberti as Dr. Arnaud
 Antônio Pitanga as Túlio
 Buza Ferraz as Grego
 Júlio Levy as Davi
 Rubens Corrêa as Congressman Ibrahim Chaguri
 Gisela Reimann as Érica

Reception 
Pantanal made history after it became the first telenovela since the closure of Rede Tupi in 1980, to top Brazilian audience ratings. Its success was so elevated that Rede Globo extended the timeslot of the 8 p.m. telenovela Rainha da Sucata and created a telenovela (Araponga) for the 10 P.M. timeslot, cancelling acclaimed shows like sketch comedy TV Pirata. The unexpected success of Pantanal put Rede Manchete on the roll of top telenovela producers in Latin America. Nevertheless, Rede Manchete would never achieve the same success with the network's other telenovelas.

Eighteen years after its original success, Pantanal once again beat Rede Globo on the ratings. The episode aired on July 3, 2008 by SBT and it spent 16 minutes on the leadership on the Greater São Paulo area.

Cultural references 
Because of its success, Pantanal's footage is shown on the Simon Hartog documentary Beyond Citizen Kane, aired on United Kingdom's Channel 4. The documentary is a critical piece of Rede Globo.

Remake 

On September 6, 2020, TV Globo announced that a new version of the series would be produced. The series will be adapted by Bruno Luperi. Jesuíta Barbosa and Alanis Guillen are set to star in the lead roles.

References

External links

Waterland research Institute: The Pantanal - Pantanal.org

Brazilian telenovelas
Portuguese-language telenovelas
1990 telenovelas
1990 Brazilian television series debuts
1990 Brazilian television series endings
Television series about shapeshifting